Agnès Clancier (born 8 June 1963) is a French writer.

She was born at Bellac, Haute-Vienne, France, and has lived in Australia and Burkina Faso. She has published five novels. Her novel Port Jackson, published by Éditions Gallimard in 2007, retraces the early history of British settlement of Australia.

Bibliography 
 Murs, 2000, Editions Climats
 L'Ile de Corail, 2001, Editions Climats
 Le Pélerin de Manhattan, 2003, Editions Climats
 Port Jackson, 2007, Éditions Gallimard
 Karina Sokolova, 2014, Éditions Arléa

External links 
 Agnès Clancier on Babelio
 Agnès Clancier - Karina Sokolova on YouTube
 Agnes Clancier Website

1963 births
Living people
People from Haute-Vienne
École nationale d'administration alumni
20th-century French novelists
21st-century French novelists
French historical novelists